A knuckle joint is a mechanical joint used to connect two rods which are under a tensile load, when there is a requirement of small amount of flexibility, or angular moment is necessary. There is always axial or linear line of action of load.

The knuckle joint assembly consists of the following major components:

 Single eye.
 Double eye or fork
 Knuckle pin.

At one end of the rod a single eye is formed and a double eye is formed at the other end of the rod. Both, single and double eye are connected by a pin inserted through the eye. The pin has a head at one end and at other end there is a taper pin or split pin. For gripping purpose, the ends of the rod are of octagonal forms. Now, when the two eyes are pulled apart, the pin holds them together. The solid rod portion of the joint in this case is much stronger than the portion through which the pin passes.

The modes of failure are:

 Shear failure of pin (single shear).
 Crushing of pin against rod.
 Tensile failure of flat end bar.

Application:

 Tie rod joint of roof truss.
 Tension link in bridge structure.
 Link of roller chain.
 Tie rod joint of jib crane.
 The knuckle joint is also used in tractor.
 Connecting rods between locomotive wheels.

Design of knuckle joint 
REF.

The assembly diagram of knuckle joint is as shown in fig.

The dimension of knuckle joints are:

 Diameter of rod = d
 Diameter of knuckle pin = dp
 Outside diameter of single eye = doe
 Outside diameter of double eye = dod
 Thickness of single eye = t
 Thickness of fork = t1
 Axial tensile force on rod = P

(1) Diameter of rod

Consider the rod is subjected to a direct tensile stress
     ς = P / π d2
From above equation, diameter of rod 'd' is obtained.

(2) Design of pin (dp)

(a) Consider the failure of pin under double shear due to tensile force.

Therefore, direct shear stress induced in knuckle pin is given by Equation
     ς = P / 2A = (P/2) / (π/4) dp2 = 2P / π dp2
(b) Failure of knuckle pin in bending

Assume there is no clearance or slack but in actual, knuckle pin is loose in forks to permit angular moment of one with respect to other, so it is subjected to bending moment in addition to shear, consider uniformly distributed load along the portion of pin.

Taking moment about axis XX
     M = [(-P/2) × (t/4)] + { (P/2) × [ (t/2)+(t1/3) ] }

 
     = P/2 [(t1/3)+(t/2)-(t/4) ]

 
     = P/2 [ (t1/3)+(t/4) ]
Section modulus,
     Z = (π/ 32)dp3
Maximum bending stress, σb
     σb= M/Z = { P/2 [(t1/3)+(t/4)] } / {(π/ 32)dp3}
Here, we check the pin in bending and find the value of dp

(3) Design of single eye :

(a) To find the outside diameter of single eye (doe) The single eye is subjected to a direct tensile stress, due to this single eye under tear.
     σt = P/A = P/ (doe-dp)× t
(b) Due to direct tensile strength, the single eye is subjected to double shear.
     Resisting shearing area = 2(doe-dp)×(t/2)
The direct shear stress induced is
     ς=P/(doe-dp)×t
From this equation the outside diameter of single eye doe is obtained.

(C) Failure of single eye or pin due to tensile load in crushing
     Resisting crushing area = dp × t

 
     σc = P/(dp×t)
Form this equation crushing stress checked if fail, increase the thickness of eye (t).

(4) Design of fork (double eye):

(a) The tearing of the double eye at weakest section due to tension
     Area resisting tear = (dof – dp) × 2 t1

 
     σt =    p/ [(dof – dp) × 2 t1]
From this equation, find the outside diameter of fork (dof).

(b) Failure of double eye (fork) in double shear due to tensile load.
     Area resisting shear  = 4 × [(dof – dp) ]/2 × t1

 
     = 2 × (dof – dp) t1
The shear stress is given by,
     ς = p/[(dof – dp) × 2 t1]
From this equation, check shear stress if less than design, increase thickness of fork t1.

(c) Failure double eye in crushing (thickness of fork)

Double eye may fail in crushing due to tensile load

The crushing stress is given by,
     σc = P/( 2×dp ×t1)
Check crushing stress or find t1

References

Mechanical fasteners